Selaginella bigelovii is a species of spikemoss known by the common names bushy spikemoss and Bigelow's spikemoss. It is native to California and Baja California, where it grows in rocky places in many different habitat types, from the coastline to the mountains to the deserts. This lycophyte forms clumps of spreading upright to erect stems up to 20 centimeters long with a few short lateral branches. The linear or lance-shaped green leaves are up to 4 millimeters long, including the tiny rigid bristles at their tips. They are flattened to the stem or stick out just a little. The strobili borne at the leaf bases are yellow-orange in color.

References

External links
Jepson Manual Treatment
USDA Plants Profile
Flora of North America
Photo gallery

bigelovii
Flora of Baja California
Flora of California
Flora of North America